Lac-Saint-Louis is a federal electoral district in Quebec, Canada, that has been represented in the House of Commons of Canada since 1997. Its population was 108,579 at the 2016 Canadian Census.

Geography
The district includes the Cities of Beaconsfield, and Pointe-Claire; the Towns of Baie-d'Urfé, Kirkland and Sainte-Anne-de-Bellevue; the Municipality of Senneville; and the western part of the borough of Pierrefonds-Roxboro of the city of Montreal.

The neighbouring ridings are Pierrefonds—Dollard, Dorval—Lachine—LaSalle and Vaudreuil—Soulanges.

History
The electoral district was created in 1996 from Lachine—Lac-Saint-Louis and Vaudreuil ridings.

This riding was largely untouched by the 2012 electoral redistribution, gaining a small territory from Notre-Dame-de-Grâce—Lachine.

Members of Parliament

This riding has elected the following Members of Parliament:

Election results

	
Note: Conservative vote is compared to the total of the Canadian Alliance vote and Progressive Conservative vote in the 2000 election.

Note: Canadian Alliance vote is compared to the Reform vote in 1997 election.

See also
 List of Canadian federal electoral districts
 Past Canadian electoral districts

References

Campaign expense data from Elections Canada
Riding history from the Library of Parliament
Lac-Saint-Louis riding profile at CBC News

Notes

Beaconsfield, Quebec
Kirkland, Quebec
Pointe-Claire
Sainte-Anne-de-Bellevue, Quebec
Baie-D'Urfé
Senneville, Quebec
Pierrefonds-Roxboro
Constituencies established in 1996
Federal electoral districts of Montreal
1996 establishments in Quebec